Cornelia Elliott "Peggy" Wayburn (September 2, 1917 – March 21, 2002) was an American author, conservationist, and photographer.

Personal life
She was born Cornelia Thomas Elliott on September 2, 1917 in New York City to Thomas Ketchin Elliott, Jr. and Cornelia Ligon Elliott. She graduated from Emma Willard School. On September 23, 1939, she married John W. Haslett, changing her name to Cornelia Elliott Haslett. In 1942, she graduated Phi Beta Kappa from Barnard College. In 1945, she moved to San Francisco to work as a copywriter for J. Walter Thompson. In 1946, she met Edgar Arthur Wayburn. Cornelia and Edgar went hiking on Mount Tamalpais for their first date, and they married less than six months later on September 12, 1947.

She died on March 21, 2002 in San Francisco after having an abdominal disease for more than three years. She was survived by three daughters, Diana Wayburn, Cynthia Wayburn, and Laurie Wayburn; one son, William Wayburn; and three grandchildren.

Bibliography

References

1917 births
2002 deaths
American conservationists
Emma Willard School alumni